Alcântara is a freguesia (civil parish) and district of Lisbon, the capital of Portugal. Located in western Lisbon, Alcântara is to the east of Ajuda and Belém and west of Estrela and Campo de Ourique. Alcântara had a population in 2011 of 13,943.

History
 
Primitive utensils from the Paleolithic era have been discovered on the margins of the Alcântara ravine, and signs in the area of Alvito and Tapada da Ajuda indicate a level of occupation in the Neolithic and Chalcolithic periods. Around 1300, Bronze Age farmers and shepherds established small villages in this area, with a subsistence economy based on herding and the cultivation of cereal crops.

During the Roman era, the local area was called Horta Navia in honour of the Roman divinity Nabia, a goddess of rivers and water. The area was notable for a Roman bridge across the Alcântara ravine  and, following the Muslim occupation, the area began to be referred to in terms of this bridge. The name Alcântara, derived from the Arab al-qantara (القنطارة) means bridge.

Medieval

After the Reconquista of Lisbon (1147), the area became integrated into the Reguengos de Ribamar that included terrain that extended from the Alcântara ravine to the Laje ravine in Oeiras. After the 13th century, the Reguengos was divided in two and the area of Alcântara was attributed, in gratitude by the King, to the nobility, religious orders or military. Yet, Alcântara became a battlefield in conflicts between Portugal and Castile, which included intrigues involving King Ferdinand and conflicts with the Kingdom of Castile after his death.

In March 1382, an armada under the authority of John I of Castile entered the Tagus estuary, but was unable to crack the defenses; the force advanced inland attacking, sacking and stealing cattle. King Ferdinand made António, Prior of Crato, the frontier commander. Later, the death of King Sebastian at the Battle of Alcácer-Quibir resulted in a crisis in dynastic succession between António, Prior of Crato, Catherine, Duchess of Braganza and Philip II of Spain. From a military perspective, in order to limit support for António's claim to the crown, Phillip II determined to invade Portugal and cement his own claim to the throne. Forces from Badajoz and a Spanish fleet from Cádiz crossed the Caia ravine on 28 June 1580, where they began their invasion. António, Prior of Crato,  concentrated his defense in Alcântara along the Caia ravine, where a double line of defense supported 36 carracks and nine galleons. The Portuguese troops had a static defense and could not resist a flanking move, which resulted in the loss of the battle and of Portuguese independence for the next 60 years.

In the 15th century, the rock quarries in Alcântara, which mined lime, contributed to the development of the locality (along with the ovens of Cais do Sodré), while orchards and vineyards along the ravines helped to diversify the regional economy.

A hospital was constructed in 1520 in the garden of Jerónimo de Eça (Horta Navia) in order to combat the plague.  Yet, the plague did not impede nobles from constructing estates along the Tagus; Alcântara was situated near the border of the parish of Ajuda, an extension of the nobility. A chapel dedicated to Santo Amaro was begun in 1549, and served as a sacristy for many of the pilgrims that crossed the territory.

Brigantine era

Although today it is quite central, it was once an outlying suburb of Lisbon, comprising mostly farms and palaces. In the 16th century, there was a brook on which the nobles used to promenade in their boats. As a result of the 1755 earthquake and tsunami, the King and his government moved to the zone of Alcântara, attracting with them the nobility, functionaries, municipal officials and those that lived alongside them, including artists, merchants and artisans. The registries during this era were full of references to families of the upper and lower nobility who began to live in this zone alongside the socially deprived and poor that already existed.

After the French invasions, agriculture and industry were paralyzed. The Liberal Wars that followed worsened these conditions along the eastern portions of Lisbon, principally along the ravine between Alcântara and Pedrouços. Still, the accentuated industrialization continued to dominate the valley and lasted until the late 19th century, resulting in many small factories and warehouses,  including numerous metal-stampers and tanneries.

Industrialization

Between 1807 and 1824, members of the Ratton family constructed a porcelain factory in Calvario, and attempted to construct a mill powered by steam which was not successful. In 1839, the Rattons established an estate in Calvário alongside their Fábrica de Lanifícios Daupias de Pedro Daupias, which was under the management of Jácome Ratton. Near this factory, a textile factory, Companhia de Fiação de Tecidos Lisbonense, was also constructed (1846–1855). Since 1876, a great part of the urbanized part of Alcântara was delimited by Calçada da Tapada and Calçada de Santo Amaro in the north, and in the east and south by Rua de Alcântara, Largo do Calvário and Rua 1º de Maio.

During the middle of the 19th century, some factories linked to chemical production (soap, candles, olive and other oils) were built in the same area, transforming the area of Calvário from an area of farms, palaces and convents into an important industrial zone. The industrial area south of Largo do Calvário and the old Rua de São Joaquim were converted and expanded to take on the new roles.

Public transport developed after Lisbon in 1860, when the area had many factories. Yet, until 1888, these services were out of range of many of the working-class of the area. The improvements in public transit contributed to the development of the bairro of Alcântara.

On 2 April 1887, a railline between Alcântara-Terra and Sintra was inaugurated. Extending until the station at Alcântara-Mar, in 1891 the rail-line was completed after public sanitation works along the beach in Alcântara (1876), which resulted in the recovery of an additional 500 meters of land from the Tagus River, which were quickly expropriated by factories, docks and warehouses.

Between 1884 and 1886, the bairros of Santo Amaro and Calvário began to develop as social housing, from lands reserved from the old Quinta da Ninfa. The lots were allocated to residents in commemoration of the 300 year anniversary of Luís Vaz de Camões.

The precarious nature of the economic conditions in the region resulted in several conflicts, including many strikes, conflicts and insurrections, such as the June 1872 event, that came to be known as the "A Pavorosa". Later, the Empresa Industrial Portuguesa, the largest and most modern metallurgical business until the 1920s, operated in Alcântara, which also created dissent and conflict. On various occasions, in 1886, in 1894 and most importantly in 1903 there were strikes, protests and conflicts between the workers and the residents of the region. The 1903 strike began on 7 December to protest the imposition of a foreign director. On 17 December the strikers, numbering hundreds, fought the police in Santo Amaro.

20th century
Around the early 1990s, Alcântara started to become a place for pubs and discotheques, mainly because its outer area is mostly commercial, and the noise generated at night, and the "movida", would not disturb its residents. Today, some of these areas are slowly being taken over by loft developments and new apartments that can profit from its river views and central location.

References

Parishes of Lisbon